Akava'ine is a Cook Islands Māori word which has come, since the 2000s, to refer to transgender people of Māori descent from the Cook Islands.

It may be an old custom but has a contemporary identity influenced by other Polynesians, through cross-cultural interaction of Polynesians living in New Zealand, especially the Samoan fa'afafine, Third Gender people who hold a special place in Samoan society.

Terms and etymology
According to the Cook Islands Maori dictionary (1995) 'akava'ine is the prefix aka ("to be or to behave like") and va'ine ("woman"), or simply, "to behave as a woman". (Antonym: akatāne ("act manly, or tomboyishly").)

The New Zealand Māori word Whakawahine has a parallel meaning, and the Samoan word fa'afafine and the Malagasy word sarambavy. 

According to Alexeyeff, Akava'ine is a Cook Islands Māori word for women who have an inflated opinion of themselves, draw attention to themselves in ways that disrupt groupness, do not heed others' advice, or who act in a self-serving or self-promoting way.

Sometimes the word laelae is also used typically when implying criticism or ridicule of feminine behaviour displayed by a man, for example being described as effeminate or homosexual. Laelae is the colloquial Cook Islands term, it is similar to raerae used in Tahiti.

The word tutuva'ine (meaning "like a woman") is used less frequently and normally refers to a cross-dresser or a drag queen.

Homosexuality is illegal for males in the Cook Islands, but there is a transgender movement in the Pacific Islands to decriminalize LGBT rights.

History
Pacific Islanders have a long history of integration, positions of authority, respect and acceptance towards gender-variant individuals. After the arrival of English missionaries during the 19th-century, this quickly began to change.

Marshall (1971:161) denied that there were "homosexuals" on Mangaia in the Cook Islands, while estimating there were two or three berdache "men on Mangaia who enjoy women's work, may have a feminine figure, and—to some degree—may dress like a woman" (Marshall 1971:153). "There is no social disapproval of the indications of transvestism". The boys and men he observed who enjoyed and excelled at women's work and who "are frequently called upon to assist in cooking, feasts, sewing pillowcases, and cutting out dresses and dress patterns" and "show no apparent wish for male sexual partners". Beaglehole (1938:287) also asserted of another locale in the Cook Islands that

Nearly two decades later Beaglehole (1957:191) did not follow-up on the wakawawine—or even recall him—in writing that

Contemporary culture
In the late 1990s, the term laelae, a borrowing from the Tahitian raerae or Rae rae, was the most commonly used term to describe "traditional" transgender categories and individuals considered to be "gay".

The usage of the Māori word Akava'ine for a transgender person seems to be recent, as no evidence of it as an established gender role in Cook Islands Māori society: it is not documented in the various detailed written encounters of the Māori people during the pre-Christian era to the mid-late 1800s to early 1900s, although these accounts are almost all by Westerners and missionaries. In contrast, Transgender people are mentioned in records of Samoa (Fa'afafine), Tahiti and Hawai'i (Māhū).

Homosexuality is outlawed in the Cook Islands for men whereas women are free to have homosexual relations.

Some akava'ine take part in the making of tivaevae (quilts), an activity traditionally done by the women of the community.

Te Tiare Association Inc (TTA) was formally incorporated on 30 November 2007 at the Rarotonga High Court; an organisation set up to bring together 'akava'ine in the Cook Islands, to help nurture, strengthen and educate them so that they can help themselves.  On 21 June 2008, there was the official launch of TTA and the launch of a partnership between TTA and the Pacific Islands Aids Foundation.

See also
LGBT rights in the Cook Islands
List of transgender-related topics

References

Bibliography

Cook Islands culture
Transgender in Oceania
Gender in Oceania
Third gender
Gender systems
Society of the Cook Islands
LGBT in the Cook Islands